The 2015 women's road cycling season was the fifth for the  Alé Cipollini cycling team, which began as the Mcipollini-Giordana in 2011.

Roster

Season victories

UCI World Ranking

The 2015 UCI Women's Road Rankings are rankings based upon the results in all UCI-sanctioned races of the 2015 women's road cycling season.

Alé Cipollini finished 9th in the 2015 ranking for UCI teams.

Footnotes

References

External links
 

2015 UCI Women's Teams seasons
2015 in Italian sport
Ale Cipollini